Oyindamola Johnson Emmanuel, popularly known as Dammy Krane, is a Nigerian singer, composer and  performer. In January 2012, at age 20, he signed a record deal with Hypertek Digital and 960 Music Group. He is most famous for his single hit "My Dear". Dammy Krane is known for his melodic voice, engaging lyrics and his exciting genre of African alternative music. Dammy Krane has received several nominations, including the Next Rated nomination.  He won Rookie of the Year at The Headies 2012.

Early life and Career 
Oyindamola Johnson was born in Lagos, Nigeria, and originates from the Yoruba ethnic group in South-West Nigeria. Dammy Krane was born to an Oluwakemi Oshodi family (whose father was a manager in the Fuji music industry at the time). Dammy Krane cites this as an early influence in his career. Starting music at age 6, joined the children's choir and ministered in various churches. He went to Providence Heights secondary school, where he was known for being an amazing dancer and performer. After graduating, Dammy Krane concentrated on his music and worked hard at his craft, eventually establishing himself as an act to watch

Inspired by artistes like Fela Kuti, Femi Kuti, Lagbaja, King Sunny Ade, 2face Idibia, D'Banj and Sauce Kid, he started recording songs on his own and performing at various university shows with his ability to merge all genres of music.

He credits his signing to Hypertek Records to a chance meeting with 2face Idibia at a birthday party. He says 2face Idibia had seen him perform and made the decision to sign him.

Controversies 
On Friday 2 June 2017, Dammy Krane was arrested in the US reportedly for grand theft, credit card fraud and identity fraud. In the days that followed more allegations were reported that he had used a stolen credit card to book a private jet from the company TapJets while on holiday in Miami. The company had detected the alleged fraud due to discrepancies in the credit card information he had provided. He was released from jail in Miami after meeting his bail conditions, set at $7,500. He pleaded not guilty to the charges and demanded a trial by jury. The singer was assigned an attorney and was billed to appear in court on June 23, 2017. His mother maintained the innocence of her son blaming his troubles on the show promoter that booked his flight ticket. In August 2017, American courts struck out all charges including credit card forgery, armed conspiracy and grand theft filed against him.

Dammy Krane allegedly collided with Davido on Sep 20, 2022 and claimed that Davido owed him an undisclosed sum of money. In a widely shared tweet, he also made sure to include Davido's actual twitter username while urging him to make good on his debt.

Discography

Albums
2010: Uni Girls
2011: Pooner
2012: Condom Sir
2014: The Enterkraner

Singles / Songs
2010 "I Like Girls Feat Piper and Flowsickk"
2010 "Uni Girls"
2011 "Below" 
2011 "Pooner" 
2012 "My Dear" 
2012 "Shalala" featuring E.L. 
2012 "Ligali feat. Pasuma" 
2012 "Condom Sir (Gangnam Style Cover)"
2012 "My Dear"
2013 "Really Love You (Yvonne Nelson) Leak" 
2013 "Gratitude" 
2013 "Xteristics" 
2013 "Lobatan" 
2013 "Sabi Dance" 
2014 "Throw Back"
2014 "Amin"
2015 "Kayefi" featuring DJ Neptunes
2015 "Tomorrow No Dey"
2015 "Izzue" featuring Davido
2016 "Solo" featuring Olamide
2017 "Aye dun" 
2017 "Gbetiti ft. Davido & Shatta Wale"
2017 "Girlfriend "
2017 "On point"
2017 "Oluwa Bless Me ft. Gweazy & Styllo"
2017 "Prayer"
2017 "Catch Feeling"
2017 "Oluwe"
2017 "Credit Card"
2017 "Shaku Shaku"
2017 "Your Body (Odoo Esisi Mi)"
2019 "Pay Me My Money"
2019 "Enjoy Lagos"
2019 "Trotro ft Kwesi Arthur
2019 "Always Say a Prayer (Asap)" featuring Peruzzi
2019 "Mood" (Laye) ft Mayorkun 
2019 "Dokomiwo"
2020 "Confess ft Nana Boro"
2020 "Wonder"

Videography

References

External links
 "US court dismisses forgery case against Dammy Krane". August 17, 2017. Vanguard.

21st-century Nigerian male singers
1992 births
Living people
Musicians from Lagos
Yoruba musicians